KAB or kab or variation, may refer to:

Culture
 Kabyle language (ISO 639 language code  kab; abbr. Kab), ISO code and common abbreviation
 An ancient Hebrew measure of capacity equal to about 1.4 liters
 Kab (month), the twelfth and last month of the Afghan calendar

Groups, organizations, companies
 Kab Distribution Inc., Canadian media company

 Kent Association for the Blind, England, UK
 Kansas Association of Broadcasters, Kansas, USA
 Kumamoto Asahi Broadcasting, television station in Kumamoto Prefecture, Japan
 Keep America Beautiful, USA; a non-profit for litter prevention and community improvement

 Kabale University (KAB), Uganda

People
 Ka'b (name), an Arab and Islamic male given name, surname, and patronymic; including a list of people
 Vyto Kab (born 1959), U.S. American football player

Places
 El Kab, an archaeological site in Egypt

Other uses
 Kyle Afferent Body (KAB), a fictional element of the Rhon psions from Saga of the Skolian Empire
 "KAB-", prefix for Russian precision-guided munitions
 KAB-1500
 KAB-1500KR
 KAB-1500L
 KAB-1500S-E
 KAB-250
 KAB-250LG-E
 KAB-250S-E
 KAB-500
 KAB-500KR
 KAB-500Kr
 KAB-500L
 KAB-500OD
 KAB-500S-E

See also

 Kab 101, an oil platform
 
 
 Kab-kab
 KABB
 Kaab (disambiguation)
 Khab (disambiguation)
 Cab (disambiguation)